Pardomima martinalis is a moth in the family Crambidae. It was described by Viette in 1957. It is found on São Tomé.

References

Moths described in 1957
Spilomelinae